Christopher Gerald Bacon (born 8 October 1969) is a retired professional British cruiserweight boxer and judoka born in Tasmania, Australia and residing in Manchester. During his professional boxing career he was trained by Bob Shannon, a long-time Manchester boxing coach. He is a former WBF European Super Cruiserweight Champion, former National Judo Champion, and Bronze medal winner at the 1990 Commonwealth Games. Bacon is former MMA fighter and also participated in the 1992 Summer Olympics in Barcelona.

Early career 
Chris Bacon started Judo at age 8, eventually mastering the art and become the National Judo Men's Champion several times in different divisions, as well as participating in other Continental and International competitions. His top place was 8th in the 1991 World Judo Championships. He also represented Australia in Judo at the 1992 Olympic Games in Barcelona, where he finished 17th out of 33 participants in the middleweight division. Bacon won, on points, his first match of the games against Wagner Castrophil and then was eliminated by Hirotaka Okada, being pinned in under a minute.

Unlicensed boxing 

Chris Bacon has taken part in many unlicensed boxing events under the EBF (European Boxing Federation), his record stands at six fights all won by TKO dating from March 2008 – December 2011. Most notable was the EBF Heavyweight Title fight against 'notorious' Dominic Negus who appeared on 'Danny Dyer's Hardest Men'. This was the fight prior to David Haye's fight with John Ruiz at the MEN Arena in Manchester with Ricky Hatton, Matthew Hatton and Tyson Fury all witnessing Bacon claim 'Guv'nor' status of the UK.

Professional boxing 

Chris Bacon made his professional boxing debut on 21 December 1997 against Tim Brown winning on points in the cruiserweight division. Chris fought Tim Brown two months later again winning on points and then moved up to Heavyweight winning a consecutive 7 fights before losing to Kelly Oliver in Dublin 19 June 1999. Bacon then moved down to Cruiserweight for his following 2 fights which he won against Collice Mutizwa and lost to Garry Delaney at the Liverpool Olympia 14 July 2001. Bacon then moved back up to heavyweight to win against O'Neil Murray and then moved back down to Cruiserweight to celebrate his first boxing title The Central Area Cruiserweight Belt with a seventh round stoppage of Liverpool's Tony Moran at The George Carnell leisure centre, Manchester, 25 February 2007.

Bacon retired from professional boxing in 2012 following an ongoing injury involving a damaged rotator cuff.

Personal life 

Chris Bacon runs a successful security firm in Manchester which is one of the reasons he has been absent from boxing over the years. In 2008 he and his promotions company KO Promotions planned to stage 'Britain's Toughest Bouncer' a reality TV show in Manchester although the City Council and Security Industry Authority condemned the idea. Bacon was the subject of a BBC Three Fresh documentary, Life through my Lens in March 2014 by Aneel Ahmad.

References 

1969 births
Living people
Australian male boxers
British male boxers
Cruiserweight boxers
Australian male judoka
Judoka at the 1992 Summer Olympics
Olympic judoka of Australia
Australian expatriate sportspeople in England
Australian male mixed martial artists
Mixed martial artists utilizing boxing
Mixed martial artists utilizing judo
Judoka at the 1990 Commonwealth Games
Commonwealth Games medallists in judo
Commonwealth Games bronze medallists for Australia
Medallists at the 1990 Commonwealth Games